Safin is a given name and surname. It may refer to:

Surname
Marat Safin, Russian tennis player
Marat Anvaryevich Safin, Russian footballer
Marat Safin (footballer, born 1972), Russian footballer
Rinnat Safin, Russian biathlete

Given name
Safin De Coque, Nigerian singer

See also
Safina (disambiguation)